Mathieu Bollen (31 December 1928 – 28 August 2008) was a Belgian footballer. He played in four matches for the Belgium national football team from 1953 to 1959. He was also named in Belgium's squad for the Group 2 qualification tournament for the 1954 FIFA World Cup.

References

External links
 
 

1928 births
2008 deaths
Belgian footballers
Belgium international footballers
Sportspeople from Genk
Association football midfielders
Belgian football managers
Club Brugge KV head coaches
K. Waterschei S.V. Thor Genk players
K. Waterschei S.V. Thor Genk managers